Barry'd Treasure is an American reality television series airing on A&E.  The series premiered on March 18, 2014, and starred Barry Weiss in a spin-off of A&E's Storage Wars. The series centered around Weiss (formerly a featured storage locker buyer on Storage Wars) as he traveled around the United States to find rare antiques and collectibles. The show also featured some of Weiss' previous Storage Wars sidekicks as they accompanied him on some of his travels.

Episodes

References

External links
 
 

2010s American reality television series
2014 American television series debuts
2014 American television series endings
English-language television shows
Television series by Original Productions
Auction television series
Storage Wars (franchise)
A&E (TV network) original programming
Antiques television series